Odd Man may refer to:
 Odd Man (comics), a comic hero created by Steve Ditko
 The Odd Man, the first in a trilogy of police series produced in the 1960s by Granada TV
 Odd Man (film), a 1998 short film featuring Shon Greenblatt

See also
 Odd Man Out (disambiguation)